Christopher Buchholz (born 4 February 1962) is a German actor, who has appeared in more than 50 films since 1986. He is the son of actors Horst Buchholz and Myriam Bru. Buchholz created a documentary about his father's life, titled Horst Buchholz … mein Papa.

Selected filmography

References

External links 

1962 births
Living people
German male film actors